Winiwarter is a German surname. Notable people with the surname include:

 Alexander von Winiwarter (1848-1917), Austrian-Belgian surgeon
 Felix Winiwarter (1930-2018), Austrian chess master
 Felix von Winiwarter (1852-1931), Austrian physician
 Verena Winiwarter (born 1961), Austrian environmental historian

German-language surnames